Rebecca Moore may refer to:

 Rebecca Moore (artist) (born 1968), American musician, actress and animal rights activist
 Rebecca Moore (pageant titleholder) (born 1988), American beauty pageant contestant
 Rebecca Moore (scientist), American software engineer and director of Google Earth
 Rebecca Moore (architect), Western Australia Government Architect (2020–present)